Dr. Itzhak Gerberg serves as Ambassador of Israel to New Zealand since 2016 and Non-Resident to the Cook Islands, Samoa and Tonga.  He also served as Ambassador to Georgia (2007-2012), concurrently to Mozambique, Namibia, Zambia, Botswana and Malawi (2002-2003), and Zimbabwe (1999-2002).

Gerberg has also served as Consul General in Shanghai (1996-1997) and Bombay (1992-1996) and Manila (1985-1989).

He earned a B.A. in Political Science from University of Tel-Aviv, a M.A. in Mass Communications from the Hebrew University, a master's degree in political science from Haifa University (1999) and a PhD in international politics from the University of South Africa (2009).

References

Israeli consuls
Ambassadors of Israel to Zambia
Ambassadors of Israel to New Zealand
Ambassadors of Israel to Georgia (country)
Ambassadors of Israel to Zimbabwe
Tel Aviv University alumni
Hebrew University of Jerusalem Faculty of Social Sciences alumni
University of South Africa alumni
Ambassadors of Israel to Malawi
Year of birth missing (living people)
Living people